The Girl in the Flat is a 1934 British crime film directed by Redd Davis and starring Stewart Rome, Belle Chrystall, Vera Bogetti and Noel Shannon. Its plot concerns a barrister's fiancée who is blackmailed over an alleged murder.

Cast
 Stewart Rome - Sir John Waterton
 Belle Chrystall - Mavis Tremayne
 Vera Bogetti - Girda Long
 Jane Millican - Kitty Fellows
 John Turnbull - Inspector Grice
 Noell Shannon - Major Cull

References

External links

1934 films
1934 crime films
Films directed by Redd Davis
British black-and-white films
British and Dominions Studios films
Films shot at Imperial Studios, Elstree
British crime films
1930s English-language films
1930s British films